Cordell Jerome Taylor (born December 22, 1973) is a former American football player. Born in Norfolk, Virginia, Taylor attended Hampton University. During his short NFL career he was a member of the Jacksonville Jaguars, Seattle Seahawks, and Chicago Bears, though he never played for Chicago. He also played in the Canadian Football League. He is currently a defensive backs coach at his alma mater, Hampton University.

External links
Just Sports Stats

1973 births
Living people
American football cornerbacks
Hampton Pirates football players
Jacksonville Jaguars players
Seattle Seahawks players
Chicago Bears players
San Francisco Demons players